Fallentimber Creek is a stream in Alberta, Canada.

Fallentimber Creek's name is an accurate preservation of its native Cree Indian name.

See also
List of rivers of Alberta

References

Rivers of Alberta